Fork Township may refer to the following places in the United States:

 Fork Township, Michigan
 Fork Township, Minnesota
 Fork Township, Wayne County, North Carolina
Forks Township, Northampton County, Pennsylvania
Forks Township, Sullivan County, Pennsylvania